The Women's eight competition at the 2016 Summer Olympics in Rio de Janeiro took place at Lagoa Rodrigo de Freitas.

Schedule

All times are Brasília Time (UTC−3)

Results

Heats

Heat 1

Heat 2

Repechage

Final

References

Women's eight
Women's events at the 2016 Summer Olympics